Freedom Park is situated on Salvokop in Pretoria. It includes a memorial with a list of the names of those killed in the South African Wars, World War I, World War II as well as during the apartheid era.

Construction
Construction of the park occurred in various phases and was dealt with by Stefanutti Stocks, WBHO, Trencon, Concor and others.

The Project was overseen in totality by Mongane Wally Serote.

Name Inclusion
In March 2009, twenty-four deceased liberation struggle heroes were proposed for inclusion to the memorial. Some of the national leaders chosen include Steve Biko, Oliver Tambo, Helen Joseph, Albert Lutuli, and Bram Fischer.

International and continental leaders were also among those considered for their contribution to the liberation of South Africa or the repressed in general. The continental leaders included Mozambican President Samora Machel and Amílcar Cabral. Amongst the international list was Che Guevara, a revolutionary who fought alongside former Cuban President Fidel Castro, and Toussaint Louverture, who fought during Haiti's war for independence.

See also

 Pretoria

References

External links 

Freedom Park  360 Virtual Tour on Visit Pretoria
Competition for the Design of the Freedom Park in Pretoria
Freedom Park Digital Collections hosted by UCLA Digital Library

Monuments and memorials in Pretoria
Museums in Pretoria
Apartheid museums
Military and war museums in South Africa